Hemizonia congesta, known by the common name hayfield tarweed, is a species of flowering plant in the family Asteraceae, native to western North America.

Description
Like other tarweeds the stem and foliage are glandular and have an odor reminiscent of tar. Most of the long, narrow, pointed leaves are located on the lower portion of the stem below the branching flower stalks.

The inflorescences are covered in glandular hairs and hold daisy-like flower heads. Each head has a center of yellowish dark-tipped disc florets and a fringe of bright yellow to white ray florets, often with purplish striping on the undersides. The ray florets are toothed or lobed on the tips, with the middle tooth thinner than the others.

Subspecies
There are many Hemizonia congesta subspecies, which can vary in appearance. They include:
Hemizonia congesta subsp. calyculata — Mendocino tarplant 
Hemizonia congesta subsp. clevelandii 
Hemizonia congesta subsp. congesta 
Hemizonia congesta subsp. leucocephala — hayfield tarplant 
Hemizonia congesta subsp. luzulifolia 
Hemizonia congesta subsp. tracyi — Tracy's tarplant

Distribution and habitat
Hemizonia congesta is native to California and Oregon, where it is a common member of the flora of a number of habitats, particularly in grasslands and fields. It is a native plant in the Central Valley (California), and the California Coast Ranges.

See also
Deinandra — the genus many other Hemizonia species were reclassified within''.

References

C.Michael Hogan, ed; 2010; Encyclopedia of Life; Hemizonia congesta overview.

External links
 Calflora Database: Hemizonia congesta (Hayfield tarweed)
 Jepson Manual eFlora (TJM2) treatment: Hemizonia congesta
USDA Plants Profile: Hemizonia congesta (Hayfield tarweed)
Hemizonia congesta — U.C. Photo gallery

Madieae
Flora of California
Flora of Oregon
Natural history of the California chaparral and woodlands
Natural history of the California Coast Ranges
Natural history of the Central Valley (California)
Natural history of the San Francisco Bay Area
Taxa named by Augustin Pyramus de Candolle
Flora without expected TNC conservation status